Pseudonocardia carboxydivorans is a bacterium from the genus of Pseudonocardia which has been isolated from soil in Seoul in Korea. Pseudonocardia carboxydivorans has the ability to oxidize carbon monoxide.

References

Pseudonocardia
Bacteria described in 2008